Hermann Hänchen (born 26 January 1898, date of death unknown) was a German athlete. He competed in the men's discus throw at the 1928 Summer Olympics.

References

1898 births
Year of death missing
Athletes (track and field) at the 1928 Summer Olympics
German male discus throwers
Olympic athletes of Germany
Place of birth missing